Holoaerenica obtusipennis is a species of beetle in the family Cerambycidae. It was described by Ernst Fuchs in 1963.

References

Aerenicini
Beetles described in 1963